The 2016 Aegon Manchester Trophy is a professional tennis tournament played on grass courts. It is the 2nd edition of the revived tournament, forming part of the 2016 ATP Challenger Tour. It will take place in Manchester, United Kingdom between 29 May and 5 June 2016.

Singles main-draw entrants

Seeds

 1 Rankings are as of May 23, 2016.

Other entrants
The following players received wildcards into the singles main draw:
  Liam Broady
  Lloyd Glasspool
  Brydan Klein
  Alexander Ward

The following players entered as alternates:
  James Duckworth
  Adrián Menéndez Maceiras
  Mischa Zverev

The following players received entry from the qualifying draw:
  Adrien Bossel
  Edward Corrie
  Marinko Matosevic
  Matt Reid

The following player received entry as a lucky loser:
  Li Zhe

Champions

Singles

  Dustin Brown def.  Lu Yen-hsun, 7–6(7–5), 6–1

Doubles

  Purav Raja /  Divij Sharan def.  Ken Skupski /  Neal Skupski, 6–3, 3–6, [11–9]

External links
 Official website

Aegon Manchester Trophy
2016
Aegon Manchester Trophy
Aegon Manchester Trophy
Aegon Manchester Trophy